Banquete is a census-designated place (CDP) in Nueces County, Texas, United States.
Banquete is located at the intersection of State Highway 44 and FM 666, 23 miles west of Corpus Christi. Banquete should not be confused with Rancho Banquete, a census-designated place situated several miles west of the community.

Banquete is a new CDP as of the 2010 census with a population of 726.

Geography
Banquete is located at  (27.800641, -97.797179).

History
Banquete was named for a four-day feast honoring the completion of a road linking San Patricio, Texas, with Matamoros, Tamaulipas, Mexico. The community was also a stop on the Texas Mexican Railway,
and Was also the place of Camp Charles Russell, a military camp to train CSA soldiers.

Education
The Banquete Independent School District serves area students. Their latest graduating class consisted of 55 seniors.

Climate
The climate in this area is characterized by hot, humid summers and generally mild to cool winters.  According to the Köppen climate classification, Banquete has a humid subtropical climate, Cfa on climate maps.

Notable people

Konni Burton, Republican member of the Texas State Senate from Tarrant County, was reared in Banquete, where her father was the school principal.

References

Unincorporated communities in Nueces County, Texas
Unincorporated communities in Texas